(750? – November 8, 785) was the fifth son of Prince Shirakabe (later Emperor Kōnin), by Takano no Niigasa.

Biography
In 781 he was named heir-presumptive after his elder brother succeeded the abdicated Emperor Kōnin as the Emperor Kanmu. In 785, the administrator in charge of the new capital of Nagaoka-kyō, Fujiwara no Tanetsugu, was assassinated. Prince Sawara was implicated because of his opposition to the move of the capital, exiled to Awaji Province, but starved himself (although a mystery remains) and died on the way there.

He was made a Crown Prince by the Emperor Kanmu after his wife died and his son fell ill (the son allegedly possessed by the spirit of Sawara). Later that year, he was elevated posthumously to become . This is the then only recorded instance of posthumously raising someone to the rank and title of emperor. He was reburied in Yamato.

Additional concerns led to the decision to move the capital again, to Heiankyō (Kyōto).

He was also made part of pantheon of onryō, "disgraced" figures enshrined at the Shinsenen in Kyōto, in 863, to appease (rather than banish) troubled, even vengeful, souls. The others were Mononobe no Moriya (killed 587), Prince Iyo (executed 807), Fujiwara no Nakanari (executed 810), Tachibana no Hayanari (died 842) and Bunya no Miyatamaro (died 843).

The kami of Prince Sawara is venerated at Sudō jinja in Shūgaku-in, Yamashiro province. The prince (Sawara-shinnō) was posthumously elevated as Emperor Sudō (Sudō-tennō).

Notes

References 
 Plutschow, Herbert.   "Tragic Victims in Japanese Religion, Politics, and the Arts," Anthropoetics Vol. 6, No. 2 (Fall 2000/Winter 2001)
 Ponsonby-Fane, Richard Arthur Brabazon. (1959).  The Imperial House of Japan. Kyoto: Ponsonby Memorial Society. OCLC 194887

750s births
785 deaths
8th-century Japanese people
Japanese princes
Suicides by starvation
Suicides in Japan
Year of birth uncertain
Emperor Kanmu
Deified Japanese people
Sons of emperors

Non-inheriting heirs presumptive